Koyil Kaalai is a 1993 Indian Tamil-language action drama film, co-produced and directed by Gangai Amaran. The film stars Vijayakanth, Kanaka, Sujatha and Veera Pandiyan. The music was composed by Ilaiyaraaja who co-produced the film. It was released on 14 January 1993.

Plot 
Abandoned on the temple doorstep, Uppili grows up to be a sort of caretaker of the temple premises, doing odd jobs. His attitude often brings him into conflict with a moneyed-man Sundaralingam who tries to misuse temple lands leased out to him. Enters Arasayi, the fire-spitting lass who ends up marrying Uppili. She is daughter of the very man Murugesan whom Uppili caught red-handed stealing temple jewels. While facts distorted, Arasayi believes Uppili to be the culprit and had come with the intention of having her revenge. However, matters get sorted out and all ends well with the villain getting his due. There is also thrack of Maragathammal who looks after three temple accounts, her dumb daughter Usha, her scraps with Sundaralingam, and Uppili timely help.

Cast 

Vijayakanth as Uppili
Kanaka as Arasayi
Sujatha as Maragathammal
Veera Pandiyan as Sundaralingam
Yuvarani as Usha
Mahima
Valarmathi
Shanmugasundaram as Murugesan
Goundamani as Ramasamy
Senthil
Vadivelu as Vadivelu
Periya Karuppu Thevar

Soundtrack 
The music was composed by Ilaiyaraaja.

Reception 
The Indian Express wrote, "The film with screenplay-direction by Gangai Amaran has nothing new by way of story or narration". R. P. R. of Kalki criticised the film for its tiring plot, rotten sequences, lack of thrilling twists and three-to-four endings, adding that had the director applied his mind he would have at least made a perfect devotional film.

References

External links 
 

1990s action drama films
1990s Tamil-language films
1993 films
Films directed by Gangai Amaran
Films scored by Ilaiyaraaja
Indian action drama films